John Alan Fishel (born November 8, 1962) is a former right-handed Major League Baseball left fielder who played for the Houston Astros in 1988.

Prior to playing professionally, he attended Cal State Fullerton, with whom he won the 1984 College World Series Most Outstanding Player as a junior outfielder.

He was originally drafted by the New York Yankees in the eighth round of the 1981 draft, but he chose not to sign. In 1984, he was drafted by the Oakland Athletics in the 19th round of the draft, but again, he did not sign. Finally, when he was drafted by the Houston Astros in the ninth round of the 1985 draft by the Astros, he did sign.

In 1985, he began his professional career with the Auburn Astros, with whom he hit .261 with nine home runs and 42 RBI in 268 at-bats. He played for the Osceola Astros in 1986, hitting .269 with 12 home runs, 83 RBI and 17 stolen bases in 490 at-bats. With the Columbus Astros in 1987, he hit .276 with 24 home runs and 88 RBI in 457 at-bats.

Fishel began the 1988 season with the Tucson Toros in 1988, and he hit .261 with 18 home runs and 68 RBI in 360 at-bats with them. On July 14, he made his big league debut, against pitcher Bruce Ruffin of the Philadelphia Phillies. Pinch-hitting for pitcher Mike Scott, Fishel grounded out in his first and only at-bat of the game. Overall, he would hit .231 in 26 big league at-bats in his only season in the majors. He appeared in 19 major league games, hitting one home run with two RBI. The home run was perhaps the biggest highlight of his big league career. It was against pitcher Steve Peters of the St. Louis Cardinals on September 3. He played his final big league game on October 2.

Although his big league career was done, his professional career was not. On January 10, 1989, Fishel was traded by the Astros with minor leaguers Mike Hook and Pedro DeLeon to the Yankees for Rick Rhoden. He played for the Columbus Clippers in both 1989 and 1990, which was his final professional season. In 1989, he hit .218 with six home runs and 31 RBI, and in 1990 he hit .200 with three home runs and 21 RBI.

Overall, Fishel hit .231 with 72 home runs and 333 RBI in his six-year minor league career.

References

External links
, or Retrosheet, or John Fishel at SABR (Baseball BioProject), or Pura Pelota {Venezuelan Winter League)

1962 births
Living people
Auburn Astros players
Baseball players from California
Cal State Fullerton Titans baseball players
College World Series Most Outstanding Player Award winners
Columbus Clippers players
Houston Astros players
Major League Baseball outfielders
Navegantes del Magallanes players
American expatriate baseball players in Venezuela
Osceola Astros players
Sportspeople from Fullerton, California
Tucson Toros players
Pan American Games medalists in baseball
Pan American Games bronze medalists for the United States
Baseball players at the 1983 Pan American Games
Medalists at the 1983 Pan American Games
Alaska Goldpanners of Fairbanks players